Daniel Georg Morhof (6 February 163930 July 1691) was a German writer and scholar.

Bibliography
Morhof was born at Wismar.  He first studied jurisprudence and then literae humaniores at the University of Rostock, where his elegant Latin versification procured for him in 1660 the chair of poetry. In 1665 he moved to the University of Kiel as professor of eloquence and poetry; this chair he exchanged for that of history in 1673. He died at Lübeck.

Of his numerous writings, the most important are Unterricht von der deutschen Sprache und Poesie (1682), the first attempt in Germany at a systematic survey of European literature, and Polyhistor, sive de auctorum notitia et rerum commentarii (Lübeck, 1688, not completed till 1707; 4th ed., 1747), a kind of encyclopaedia of the knowledge and learning of his time.

References

1639 births
1691 deaths
German scholars
People from Wismar
University of Rostock alumni
Academic staff of the University of Rostock
Academic staff of the University of Kiel